Reng is a surname. Notable people with the name include:

Ben Mang Reng Say (1928–2003), Indonesian politician
Ronald Reng (born 1970), German sports journalist and author
Sarah Reng Ochekpe (born 1961), Nigerian Politician

See also
Grand-Reng, is a small village located in the Belgian province of Hainaut
Vieux-Reng, is a commune in the Nord department in northern France